The Military Intelligence and Reconnaissance Administration, is the agency of the Egyptian Ministry of Defence responsible for military intelligence. It is one of the three Egyptian intelligence services, along with the General Intelligence Directorate and Homeland Security.

A number of senior army officers have led the agency, including Field Marshal Abdel-Halim Abu Ghazala, a former defence minister, Gen. Omar Suleiman, the former vice president and former head of the General Intelligence Service, and Major General Murad Muwafi President of the General Intelligence Service, who was appointed successor to Suleiman in January / December 2011.

Specialties of the agency include reconnaissance to discover enemy movements, collecting information on enemy formations and preparations in wartime and peacetime, and geographical surveys.  The agency has also, since the time of Abdul Nasser, conducted an internal mission to detect anti-regime elements within the military.

Historically, the agency suffered two major blows: failing to predict the Israeli attack on Egypt in the 1967 Arab-Israeli War, and failing to stop the assassination of President Anwar Sadat by Islamists linked to the military in 1981.  According to General Mohammad Sadiq (1917-1991), director of intelligence during the 1967 war, the most important reason for the intelligence failure then was the lack of coordination between GID and military intelligence.

Tasks 
 Protect the state from any possible attack from the enemy and know the capabilities and military capabilities of the enemy
 Planning and coordination with the military police to ensure the security of military facilities and barracks, leading this department Colonel/ Gamal eldin Elsabrouty.
 The level of security control in military installations and security including documents and personnel, weapons and other security
 Counter-intelligence to obtain a Top Secret security clearance with Sensitive Compartmented Information eligibility, and a shield to any cyberattacks, leading this department lieutenant-colonel/ Elhamy Elsebaey, and Colonel/ Amr Labeb.
 The use of available sources of information to monitor the enemy's military activities
 Ensure good discipline and loyalty of officers and individuals
 Cooperation with other intelligence agencies in the same state for the exchange of information and complete the tasks, ensuring the achievement of national security
 Ensure that everything is going within order and Military structure is working smoothly

Directors 

Brigade Staff of War Zakaria Mohieddin (1952–1953).
Brigade Staff of War Mohammed Sadiq (1966–1969), promoted to the rank of general and served as Minister of War.
Brigade Staff of War Mehrez Mustafa (1969–1972).
Brigade Staff of War Mohamed Abdel Ghani el-Gamasy (1972), promoted to the rank of marshal and served as Minister of War.
Brigade Staff of War Mohamed Fouad Nassar (1972–1975).
Brigade Staff of War Labib Sharab.
Brigade Staff of War Emad Thabet.
Brigade Staff of War Mahmoud Abd Allah.
Brigade Staff of War Abd al-Halim Abu Ghazala (1979–1980), promoted to the rank of marshal and served as Minister of Defense.
Brigade Staff of War Ahmed Abd El Rahman (1980–1986)
Brigade Staff of War Amin Nimr (1986–1989)
Brigade Staff of War Omar Suleiman (1991–1993).
Brigade Staff of War Kamal Amer (1994–1997).
Brigade Staff of War Mohamed Fareed (2004).
Brigade Staff of War Murad Muwafi (2004–2010).
Brigade Staff of War Abdel Fattah al-Sisi (2010–2012), promoted to the rank of Marshal and served as Minister of Defense.
Brigade Staff of War Mahmoud Hijazi (2012–2014), promoted to the rank of lieutenant general and is currently the Chief of Staff of the Armed Forces.
Brigade Staff of War Salah Al-Badri (2014–2015)
Brigade Staff of War Mohammed Farag El Shahat (2015–2018)
Brigade Staff of War Khaled Megawer (2018–present)

See also
General Intelligence Directorate (Egypt)
Homeland Security (Egypt)
Ministry of Defence (Egypt)
Egyptian Armed Forces
Abdel Fattah al-Sisi

References

1952 establishments in Egypt
Government agencies established in 1952
Military of Egypt
Military intelligence agencies
Egyptian intelligence agencies